Faycal Ben Amara (born 4 February 1970) is a Tunisian volleyball player. He competed at the 1988 Summer Olympics and the 1996 Summer Olympics.

References

External links

1970 births
Living people
Tunisian men's volleyball players
Olympic volleyball players of Tunisia
Volleyball players at the 1988 Summer Olympics
Volleyball players at the 1996 Summer Olympics
Place of birth missing (living people)